Semantically-Interlinked Online Communities Project (SIOC) is a Semantic Web technology. SIOC provides methods for interconnecting discussion methods such as blogs, forums and mailing lists to each other. It consists of the SIOC ontology, an open-standard machine readable format for expressing the information contained both explicitly and implicitly in Internet discussion methods, of SIOC metadata producers for a number of popular blogging platforms and content management systems, and of storage and browsing/searching systems for leveraging this SIOC data.

The SIOC vocabulary is based on RDF and is defined using RDFS. SIOC documents may use other existing ontologies to enrich the information described. Additional information about the creator of the post can be described using FOAF Vocabulary and the foaf:maker property. Rich content of the post (e.g., an HTML representation) can be described using the AtomOWL or RSS 1.0 Content module.

The SIOC project was started in 2004 by John Breslin and Uldis Bojars at DERI, NUI Galway. In 2007, SIOC became a W3C Member Submission.

Example
<sioc:Post rdf:about="http://johnbreslin.com/blog/2006/09/07/creating-connections-between-discussion-clouds-with-sioc/">
    <dc:title>Creating connections between discussion clouds with SIOC</dc:title>
    <dcterms:created>2006-09-07T09:33:30Z</dcterms:created>
    <sioc:has_container rdf:resource="http://johnbreslin.com/blog/index.php?sioc_type=site#weblog"/>
    <sioc:has_creator>
        <sioc:UserAccount rdf:about="http://johnbreslin.com/blog/author/cloud/" rdfs:label="Cloud">
            <rdfs:seeAlso rdf:resource="http://johnbreslin.com/blog/index.php?sioc_type=user&sioc_id=1"/>
        </sioc:UserAccount>
    </sioc:has_creator>
    <foaf:maker rdf:resource="http://johnbreslin.com/blog/author/cloud/#foaf"/>
    <sioc:content>SIOC provides a unified vocabulary for content and interaction description: a semantic layer that can co-exist with existing discussion platforms.
    </sioc:content>
    <sioc:topic rdfs:label="Semantic Web" rdf:resource="http://johnbreslin.com/blog/category/semantic-web/"/>
    <sioc:topic rdfs:label="Blogs" rdf:resource="http://johnbreslin.com/blog/category/blogs/"/>
    <sioc:has_reply>
        <sioc:Post rdf:about="http://johnbreslin.com/blog/2006/09/07/creating-connections-between-discussion-clouds-with-sioc/#comment-123928">
            <rdfs:seeAlso rdf:resource="http://johnbreslin.com/blog/index.php?sioc_type=comment&sioc_id=123928"/>
        </sioc:Post>
    </sioc:has_reply>
</sioc:Post>

See also
 DOAP
 Online Presence Ontology
 SKOS
 XML

References

Further reading

 John G. Breslin, Uldis Bojārs, Alexandre Passant, Sergio Fernández, Stefan Decker. SIOC: Content Exchange and Semantic Interoperability Between Social Networks. W3C Workshop on the Future of Social Networking, 15–16 January 2009, Barcelona, Spain.
 Uldis Bojars, John G. Breslin, Vassilios Peristeras, Giovanni Tummarello, Stefan Decker. Interlinking the Social Web with Semantics. IEEE Intelligent Systems, Volume 23, Issue 3 (May/June 2008), pp. 29–40.
 John G. Breslin, Andreas Harth, Uldis Bojars, Stefan Decker. Towards Semantically Interlinked Online Communities. 2nd European Semantic Web Conference, Heraklion, Greece, May 29 to June 1, 2005, pp. 500–514. LNCS 3532.
 Andreas Harth, John G. Breslin, Ina O'Murchu, Stefan Decker. Linking Semantically-Enabled Online Community Sites. 1st Workshop on FOAF, Social Networking, and the Semantic Web, Galway, Ireland, Proceedings, September 2004.

External links
 SIOC Project
 SIOC Ontology Specification
 SIOC Applications
 SIOC Browser
 SIOC W3C Member Submission

Social networking services
Semantic Web
Ontology (information science)